William Hill, known professionally as Billie Ritchie (5 September 1874 – 6 July 1921), was a Scottish comedian who first gained transatlantic fame as a performer for British music hall producer Fred Karno — thus, a full decade before Stan Laurel and Charlie Chaplin took a similar career path. Ritchie is best recalled today for the silent comedy shorts he made between 1914 and 1920 for director/producer Henry Lehrman's L-KO Kompany and Fox Film Sunshine Comedy unit.

Biography
Variations on Ritchie's "tramp" and "drunk" personae – which Ritchie claimed he had developed before and during his Karno years – were introduced to film audiences by Charlie Chaplin in such shorts as the Lehrman-directed Kid Auto Races at Venice (7 February 1914) and Mabel's Strange Predicament (9 February 1914).

Ritchie, who, due to a series of on-set injuries, spent his final years relatively inactive, succumbed to stomach cancer in the summer of 1921. Winifred Frances, the comedian's widow, and one-time stage partner, wound up in the employ of Charlie Chaplin as a wardrobe mistress, showing there was no animosity between the two performers. Wyn Ritchie, their daughter, was also a performer, and, in private life, the wife (for 55 years) of songwriter Ray Evans.

In popular culture
In 1918 Dutch illustrator David Bueno de Mesquita created a comic book about Ritchie named Billie Ritchie en Zijn Ezel (Billie Ritchie and his Donkey). This was the first celebrity comic in Dutch history.

Notes

References

External links

 
 
 
 
 
 The Ray and Wyn Ritchie Evans Foundation Official Website
 Wyn Ritchie Evans Papers- University of Pennsylvania 

1874 births
1921 deaths
Comedians from Glasgow
Scottish male comedians
20th-century Scottish comedians
British male comedy actors
Scottish male film actors
Scottish male silent film actors
Scottish emigrants to the United States